Vanakkam Tamizha is a 2017 Tamil-language live morning Talk show which airs on Sun TV from 4 December 2017 on Monday to Friday at 8:00AM (IST). The show includes news, weather reports, kitchen tips, entertainment and technology and sports. The show is hosted by Aswath, Anjalin, Aarthi Subhash, Sambhavi Gurumoorthy, Vj Rakesh, Bavithra and Vj Nikki.

List of episodes
2017

Airing History
The show started airing live morning show on Sun TV from 4 December 2017 on Monday to Friday at 8:00 AM, Later it's airing Monday to Saturday at 8:00 AM. The show is hosted by Sangeetha, Bavithra, Aniruth, Anitha Sampath, Sastika, Azhar, Shali and more recently by Uma Punjabagesan, Aishwarya Muthushivam, Pujitha Devaraju and Diya Menon.

Adaptations
This is the original version and the remakes which are given listed below.

References

External links
 Vanakkam Tamizha at Sun NXT
 

Sun TV original programming
2017 Tamil-language television series debuts
Tamil-language television shows
Tamil-language talk shows
Television shows set in Tamil Nadu